Williams Grove is an unincorporated community in Monroe Township, Cumberland County, Pennsylvania, United States. Williams Grove is located off U.S. Route 15 and is home to the Williams Grove Speedway and defunct Williams Grove Amusement Park.

History
The John Williams House was added to the National Register of Historic Places in 1977.

References

Unincorporated communities in Cumberland County, Pennsylvania
Unincorporated communities in Pennsylvania